L.N. "Leen" van Beuzekom was an Indonesian football goalkeeper who played for the Dutch East Indies in the 1938 FIFA World Cup. He also played for VIOS Batavia and Hercules Batavia.

References

External links
 

Indonesian footballers
Indonesia international footballers
Association football goalkeepers
1938 FIFA World Cup players
VIOS Batavia players